The Kolb Ultrastar is an American single seat, high wing, strut-braced, single engine, pusher configuration, conventional landing gear-equipped ultralight aircraft that was produced in kit form by Kolb Aircraft of Phoenixville, Pennsylvania and intended for amateur construction.

The Ultrastar was the second design produced by Kolb Aircraft, was a redesigned and improved Kolb Flyer and succeeded the Flyer in production.

Design and development
The Ultrastar features a completely open cockpit with the pilot exposed to the slipstream. Unusually for this period in aircraft history when most ultralights had two-axis control, the Ultrastar has standard three-axis controls, including full span ailerons.

When the original Flyer was designed there were no suitable lightweight engines available, so the Flyer first fitted two Chrysler powerplants and later two  Solo 209 engines. With the advent of better engines the Ultrastar moved to a single Cuyuna 430 engine producing .

The design features a forward fuselage of welded 4130 steel tubing, mated to an aluminum tailboom. The horizontal stabilizer, tail fin and wings are also constructed of riveted aluminum tubing with all flying surfaces covered in doped aircraft fabric. The Ultrastar introduced the trademark folding wings and tail that became a feature of future Kolb designs.

Like the Flyer, the Ultrastar's conventional landing gear consists of sprung steel tubing for the main gear but replaced the Flyer's sprung tail skid with a steerable sprung tail wheel instead.

Variants
Ultrastar
Original model
Ultrastar KX430
Improved model with simplified steel tubular pilot cage and main landing gear tubular spring suspension

Specifications (Ultrastar)

See also

References

External links
Photo of Kolb Ultrastar
Photo of Kolb Ultrastar

Ultrastar
1980s United States ultralight aircraft